Andile Witbooi (17 November 1991 – 30 May 2019) was a South African rugby union player, who played for the  U19 team in 2010 and the U21 team in 2011, where he was the leading try scorer in Division B. He was included in the Kings' first team squad for their 2011 Currie Cup First Division semi-final against the .

On 31 May 2019, it was announced that Witbooi had died.

References

South African rugby union players
Eastern Province Elephants players
1991 births
2019 deaths
Place of death missing
Rugby union wings